Jacob J. Laktonen, Jr.  was an American accountant and politician. Laktonen served a single term in the Alaska House of Representatives in the 1970s. He was employed for at least four decades by the Alaska Packers' Association and was an accountant for them at the time he served in the House. Laktonen was a Republican and a Native American, and his residence was Larsen Bay. A veteran and a commercial fishersman, Laktonen also founded and served on the Larsen Bay Village Council.

References

1917 births
1996 deaths
20th-century Native Americans
Republican Party members of the Alaska House of Representatives
Native American state legislators in Alaska
People from Kodiak Island Borough, Alaska